Center City is the downtown and central business district of Allentown, Pennsylvania, the third largest city in the U.S. state of Pennsylvania. It has a dense population and is currently undergoing an urban revitalization process.

Boundaries
Allentown's Center City is generally defined as the area centered around Hamilton Street and Seventh Street: bordered by the Little Lehigh Creek to the east, Martin Luther King Jr. Drive to the south, the city line with Whitehall to the north, and 15th Street to the west.

Demographics
Center City's population based on a 2007 estimate was 53,548.  Center City is defined as 6.271 sq. mi., making the population density 8539/square miles.

Neighborhood features
Center City's tallest building is the PPL Building at 322 ft (98 m).  The Allentown Art Museum, Miller Symphony Hall, the former site of Hess's Department Stores' original and flagship store, Baum School of Art, Lehigh County Historical Society and Heritage Museum, and The Liberty Bell Museum are Center City landmarks. An 8,500-capacity indoor arena, PPL Center, opened in August 2014, and is the home arena for the Lehigh Valley Phantoms, the primary development team of the Philadelphia Flyers of the National Hockey League.

Neighborhoods
Center City Allentown includes several residential neighborhoods: Seventh Street, Downtown, Old Allentown, Old Fairgrounds District, and NOTI (North of Tilghman Street).

Economy
Center City is home to the corporate headquarters of PPL Corporation.

Education
Center City Allentown's public schools, which are operated by Allentown School District, include:

High schools
Allen High School
Dieruff High School

Middle schools
Francis D. Raub Middle School
Harrison-Morton Middle School
South Mountain Middle School
Trexler Middle School

Elementary schools
Central Elementary School
Cleveland Elementary School
Hiram Dodd Elementary School
Jackson Elementary School
Jefferson Elementary School
Lehigh Parkway Elementary School
Lincoln Elementary School
Luis A. Ramos Elementary School
McKinley Elementary School
Mosser Elementary School
Midway Manor Elementary School
Muhlenberg Elementary School
Ritter Elementary School
Roosevelt Elementary School
Sheridan Elementary School
Union Terrace Elementary School
Washington Elementary School

Charter schools
Roberto Clemente Charter School

Private schools
Allentown Central Catholic High School
Cathedral of St. Catharine of Siena School
Holy Spirit School
Mercy Special Learning Center
Sacred Heart School
St. Francis of Assisi School

See also
Allentown, Pennsylvania
List of Allentown neighborhoods
List of people from the Lehigh Valley

External links

Old Allentown Preservation Association website

Geography of Allentown, Pennsylvania
Allentown
Neighborhoods in Pennsylvania